Vainikka is a Finnish surname. Notable people with the surname include:

 Riitta Uosukainen (born 1942), née Vainikka, Finnish politician
 Anne Vainikka (1958–2018), Finnish linguist

Finnish-language surnames